Gornja Rijeka may refer to:
 Gornja Rijeka, Croatia, a village and a municipality near Križevci
 Gornja Rijeka, Bosnia and Herzegovina, a village in the Rudo municipality